Do Me a Favour, or Do Me a Favor (American English) may refer to:

Do Me a Favour (novel), a 1963 novel by Susan Hill
Do Me a Favor (film), a 1997 American film 
"Do Me a Favor", episode from Lotsa Luck American sitcom 1973–74

Music
"Do Me a Favor", song from Carrie musical
"Do Me a Favour", song by Arctic Monkeys from Favourite Worst Nightmare album
"Do Me a Favor" (song), a 2013 song by Stone Sour
"Do Me a Favor", song by Vern Gosdin from Alone album